= Rupert Etherege Kingsford =

Canadian lawyer, magistrate, and writer

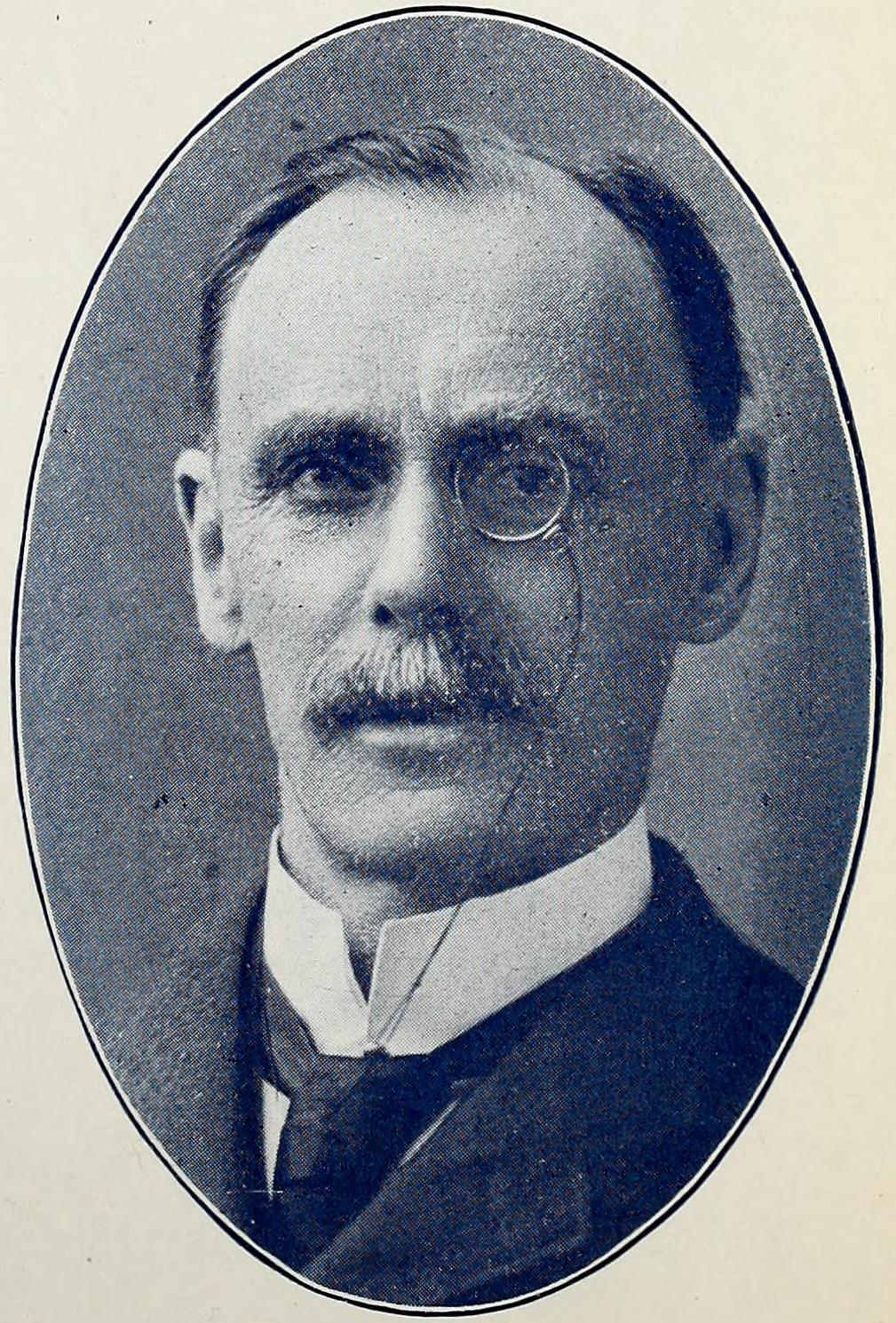
Kingsford circa 1920

Rupert Etherege Kingsford (October 20, 1849 – October 7, 1920) was a Canadian lawyer, magistrate, and writer.

Rupert Etherege Kingsford was born in Montreal, Canada East, on October 20, 1849. He attended Upper Canada College and the University of Toronto, from which he received a BA and the silver medal in classics and modern languages in 1869, an MA in 1871, and an LLB in 1873. He was called to the bar of Ontario in 1873.

In June 1894, he was appointed a deputy police magistrate in Toronto, Ontario. He became an assistant magistrate in March 1899.

Kingsford published several books on law and other subjects. The Campaign of 1815 (1887) describes the Battle of Waterloo and related events. Kingsford also wrote A Manual of Evidence in Civil Cases, which entered its second edition in 1897; A Manual of the Law of Landlord and Tenant for Use in the Province of Ontario (1896); Commentaries on the Law of Ontario; Being Blackstone's Commentaries on the Laws of England Adapted to the Province of Ontario (also in 1896); and The Law Relating to Executors and Administrators (1900).

Kingsford died in Toronto on October 7, 1920.
